The 2007 South Holland District Council election took place on 3 May 2007 to elect members of the South Holland District Council in England. It was held on the same day as other local elections.

Results

Council composition
After the election, the composition of the council was:

Ward results
Source

Crowland & Deeping St. Nicholas

Donington Quadring & Gosberton

Fleet

Gedney

Holbeach Hurn

Holbeach Town

Long Sutton

Moulton Weston & Cowbit

Pinchbeck & Surfleet

Spalding Castle

Spalding Monks House

Spalding St. Johns

Spalding St. Marys

Spalding St. Pauls

Spalding Wygate

Sutton Bridge

The Saints

Whaplode & Holbeach St. Johns

References

2007 English local elections
May 2007 events in the United Kingdom
2007
2000s in Lincolnshire